Chris Benjamin may refer to:
 Chris Benjamin (cricketer)
 Chris Benjamin (journalist)